Albatros was an Italian-built hydrofoil in service with the Compagnie générale de navigation sur le lac Léman (CGN), commissioned for Expo 64. After initial success, technical difficulties and a flagging number of users led to her decommissioning. She was then sold to a French company in 1972.

History 
In the early 1960, the imminence of Expo 64 led to a number of engineering projects being started in the vicinity of Lausanne. In the contexte, the Compagnie générale de navigation sur le lac Léman (CGN), which operates both historical steam paddle ships and modern liners on the Lake of Geneva, was studying the commissioning of a modern unit. On 10 May 1962, its extraordinary assembly of shareholders decided on ordering a hydrofoil. The chosen design was by Leopoldo Rodriquez, from Messina, for a 1.2 million CHF budget.

Albatros was built during the year 1963. On 8 February 1964, she departed Messina for her maiden journey to Marseille, thus becoming the first CGN ship sailing the open sea.. Upon arriving in Marseille, she was lifted on a truck and brought to Lausanne by road.

On 16 April, Albatros was put in service as a shuttle on the Vidy-Évian line. Her draft would prevent from entering the roads of Gevena in most conditions. In 1970, due to a diminishing public, CGN decided to sell Albatros.

In 1972, Albatros was sold to a company of Lavandou.

Notes and references

Bibliography 
 Jacques Christinat, Bateaux du Léman, deux siècles de Navigation, collection Archives vivantes, Éditions Cabédita, Yens-sur-Morges, 1991, pp. 196–197

External links 
 
 
 

Hydrofoils
1963 ships
Ships built in Italy
Ship names